Steven Ross Purcell (born October 1, 1961) is an American cartoonist, animator, game designer and voice actor. He is the creator of the media franchise Sam & Max, for which Purcell received an Eisner Award in 2007. The series has grown to incorporate an animated television series and several video games.

A graduate of the California College of Arts and Craft, Purcell began his career creating comic strips for the college newsletter. He performed freelance work for Marvel Comics and Fishwrap Productions before publishing his first Sam & Max comic in 1987. Purcell was hired by LucasArts as an artist and animator in 1988 and worked on several LucasArts adventure games, including the first three Monkey Island games,  Indiana Jones and the Last Crusade and Sam & Max Hit the Road.

Purcell collaborated with Nelvana to create a Sam & Max television series in 1997, and briefly worked as an animator for Industrial Light & Magic after leaving LucasArts. He is currently employed in the story development department at Pixar.

Career

Early career
Purcell entered into a career with comic books while an undergraduate at the California College of the Arts in 1980; he produced comic strips for the weekly newsletter. These strips featured Sam and Max, an anthropomorphic dog and rabbit duo who work as vigilantes and private investigators; Purcell drew the first strip the night before the deadline. Following his graduation in 1982, Purcell became involved in freelance illustration, working briefly for Marvel Comics, Chaosium, and on Steven Moncuse's Fish Police series. Moncuse approached Purcell about the possibility of another comic book series to accompany his well-performing Fish Police series in 1987. Purcell agreed, and wrote his first feature-length comic using the characters of Sam and Max. The 32-page comic was published by Fishwrap Productions in 1987. The comic contained two Sam & Max stories: "Monkeys Violating the Heavenly Temple", a name that Purcell found on a firework and thought was appropriate; and "Night of the Gilded Heron-Shark". Purcell published a further story in a 1987 issue of Critters titled "Night of the Cringing Wildebeest". These three stories established the basics for Purcell's future work with the characters.

LucasArts
Purcell was hired by LucasArts, then known as Lucasfilm Games, as an animator in 1988, but was subsequently laid off when the project he was working on was canceled. He was rehired to produce art for the graphic adventure game Zak McKracken and the Alien Mindbenders. Purcell was later commissioned to create the cover artwork for Maniac Mansion and the first two Monkey Island games and researched into whips for the adventure game version of Indiana Jones and the Last Crusade. He worked with animation in several LucasArts adventure games, published three more Sam & Max comic books during this time, and began creating brief comic strips for LucasArts' quarterly newsletter, The Adventurer. The characters eventually became involved as training material for LucasArts programmers working with SCUMM, the core game engine used by LucasArts adventure games; Purcell created versions of Sam and Max in their office for new programmers under Ron Gilbert to practice on. References to the characters were occasionally made in unrelated LucasArts adventure games as a clandestine appearance in backgrounds. Purcell wrote the six-issue comic book series Defenders of Dynatron City for Marvel Comics in 1992.

After a positive reaction to the Sam & Max strips in The Adventurer and wanting to expand into other franchises following Maniac Mansion and Monkey Island, LucasArts offered to create a graphic adventure game on the characters in 1992. Sam & Max Hit the Road was conceived and developed by a small team headed by Purcell, Sean Clark, Michael Stemmle and Collette Michaud. Purcell decided to base the game on one of his earlier Sam & Max stories, the 1988 story "On The Road". In 1995, Purcell combined all published Sam & Max printed media into a 154-page paperback compilation titled Sam & Max: Surfin' the Highway. After producing the cover art for Herc's Adventures and concept art for The Curse of Monkey Island, Purcell left LucasArts.

Later work
Purcell joined with story editor Dan Smith from Canadian studio Nelvana to create an animated television series of Sam & Max in 1996. The result was the 1997 series The Adventures of Sam & Max: Freelance Police, broadcast on Fox Kids in the United States, YTV in Canada and Channel 4 in the United Kingdom. Purcell wrote the jokes for each installment of the 24-episode series, and wrote the scripts for four episodes. Despite the violence and profanity common in the Sam & Max franchise having been toned down due to the target audience of children, Purcell was content that the characters maintained their moral ambiguity. Some parent groups in the United States attempted to have the series pulled from networks due to content issues; Purcell was pleased that they "had managed to ruffle some feathers along the way". Two Sam & Max comic strips appeared in Fox's Totally Fox Kids Magazine in 1998 to accompany the series; other Sam & Max strips appeared in Wizard and Oni Double Feature. During the development of the television series in 1997, Purcell co-authored and illustrated the Hellboy Christmas Special with Mike Mignola and Gary Gianni. After the conclusion of the Sam & Max animated series, Purcell was briefly employed by Industrial Light & Magic to work on digital effects for a film version of Frankenstein. Despite his work, the project was canceled; Purcell believes that some of the development work morphed into ILM's contributions to Van Helsing. While at ILM, Purcell was involved in a project to create an animated film based on Monkey Island; while the project did not reach fruition, Purcell began posting concept art he had produced for the film on his personal blog several years after.

Pixar and Telltale Games
After the brief stint at ILM, Purcell moved to Pixar. Despite being employed by Pixar, Purcell acted as an advisor in the development of Sam & Max: Freelance Police, a sequel to Sam & Max Hit the Road that began development in 2002 under LucasArts. Purcell provided Michael Stemmle's development team with concept art and assisted in the creation of the game's plot. Despite its smoothly proceeding development, LucasArts abruptly canceled the project in March 2004. Purcell was unable to understand why development halted; he described himself as "frustrated and disappointed" at the decision.

In 2005, LucasArt's license with Purcell that gave them the right to produce games based on the Sam & Max franchise expired; this allowed Purcell to take the franchise to Telltale Games, a new company formed by members of Stemmle's development team. A new episodic series of Sam & Max games, Sam & Max Save the World, was announced. Purcell's work on the new game series encompassed design and writing, as well as the design of the game's cover art; despite his work, Purcell described it as "minimal" due to the effectiveness of the team. At the same time, Purcell began a Sam & Max webcomic hosted on the Telltale Games website. The webcomic ran for twelve issues, and it earned Purcell an Eisner Award for "Best Digital Comic" when the comic finished its run in 2007. Purcell assisted with design and writing when Sam & Max Beyond Time and Space began development in 2007. Through Telltale Games, he released two sketchbooks of his Sam & Max work and a 20th anniversary edition of Sam & Max: Surfin' the Highway in 2008. Purcell later painted the cover art for Telltale's Tales of Monkey Island.

At Pixar's story development department, Purcell contributed screenplay material and voice work for the 2006 film Cars, and designed the character of the Screaming Banshee in the short Mater and the Ghostlight. Providing scripts and voice work for three games based on Cars, Purcell became involved with THQ's video game adaptations of Pixar films. Purcell was credited for involvement with Pixar's 2007 film Ratatouille; he provided the voice for the character of Carl in George & A.J.—a 2009 short based on the film Up. Purcell was key for Pixar's 2012 film Brave, co-directing the film alongside Brenda Chapman and Mark Andrews in addition to providing work for the screenplay; Brave constituted Purcell's biggest role in a Pixar project to date.

In 2014, Purcell wrote and directed the Pixar Christmas special Toy Story That Time Forgot which aired on ABC on December 2, 2014. Purcell is not considering the possibility of Pixar adapting Sam & Max into a film, as the characters' moral ambiguity is inconsistent with traditional Pixar stories.

Personal life
Purcell grew up in California, where he still resides. In a 2000 interview, Purcell said that he had been drawing all his life, and that he still possesses drawings from when he was three years old. Noting that his line of creative work depends entirely on things one learns, Purcell describes himself as an "average" student at school, but wishing that he had tried harder at some classes. After studying film-making courses at junior college, Purcell enrolled in the California College of the Arts to read fine art; he now holds a bachelor's degree there. Purcell befriended Mike Mignola, and later Art Adams while at the college. Citing the Marx Brothers, Peter Sellers and Monty Python as among his interests, he says that he is inspired by "creative people who have made their seemingly most self-indulgent artistic whims into a career". During the development of Sam & Max Hit the Road in 1993, Purcell married fellow lead designer Collette Michaud; the wedding cake was topped with figurines of Sam and Max as a bride and groom. Purcell has two sons.

The characters of Sam and Max were created in Purcell's youth; Purcell's younger brother Dave originally came up with several comics around the idea of a dog and rabbit detective duo. Dave would often leave unfinished comics around the house. Deliberately making the characters mix up each other's names, shoot at each other and mock the way in which they had been drawn, Steve, in a case of sibling rivalry, would sometimes finish the stories in parodies of their original form. This developed from Steve mocking his brother's to the creation of his own stories with the characters. In the late 1970s, Dave Purcell gave Steve the rights to the characters; he signed them over in a contract on Steve's birthday and allowed him to develop the characters in his own way. Purcell believes that his younger brother has recovered and forgiven him from their earlier years. Having kept one as a pet in his youth, Purcell has an interest in rats, which are commonly featured in his artistic work.

Credited works

Films

Shorts

Television

Bibliography

 Amazing High Adventure (1984) – cover artwork
 Different Worlds #33, #35, #36 and #37 (1984) – cover artwork
 New Mutants #43 (1986) – pencils
 Fish Police #6 (1987) – pencils
 Fish Police #7 (1987) –  pencils, inks and letters
 Fish Police #9 (1987) – pencils and inks
 Alpha Flight #47 (1987) – pencils
 Sam & Max: Freelance Police special edition (1987)
 Critters #19: Sam & Max in "Night of the Cringing Wildebeest" (1987)
 Tournament of Dreams (1987) – cover artwork
 RuneQuest (1987–88) – cover artwork
 Gumby's Winter Fun Special (1988) – writing
 GrimJack #52: Sam & Max in "Fair Wind to Java" (1988)
 Sam & Max: Freelance Police special (1989)
 Critters #50: Sam & Max in "The Damned Don't Dance" (1990)
 Marvel Comics Presents #41: "Wolverine" (1990) – pencils and inks
 Sam & Max: Freelance Police: "Bad Day on the Moon" (1992)
 Sam & Max: Freelance Police special color edition (1992)
 Fast Forward #3 (1992) – pencils, inks and color
 Defenders of Dynatron City (1992)
 The Collected Sam & Max: Surfin' The Highway (1995)
 Dark Horse Presents #107: "Rusty Razorclam, President of Neptune" (1996) – writing
 Hellboy Christmas Special (1997) – writing, pencils, ink and color
 Wizard: Sam & Max in "Belly of the Beast" (1997)
 Oni Double Feature #10: Sam & Max in "Skeptical Investigators" (1998)
 Totally Fox Kids Magazine #10: Sam & Max in "Something's Not Right Here" (1998)
 Totally Fox Kids Magazine #31: Sam & Max in "Action Figure Surgery" (1998)
 Batman Villains Secret Files and Origins #1: "If A Man Be Clay!" (2005)
 Sam & Max: The Big Sleep (2005–2007)
 The Age of S&M (2006)
 The Effigy Mound (2007)
 Sam & Max: Surfin' The Highway anniversary edition (2008)
 Brave: One Perfect Day (2012)

Video games

 Zak McKracken and the Alien Mindbenders (1988) – artwork
 Their Finest Hour (1989) – testing
 Pipe Dream (1989) – artwork
 Indiana Jones and the Last Crusade: The Graphic Adventure (1989) – animation, artwork and whip research
 Maniac Mansion (1987) – artwork
 Loom (1990) – animation, graphics and artwork
 The Secret of Monkey Island (1990) – graphics and artwork
 Monkey Island 2: LeChuck's Revenge (1991) – animation, graphics and artwork
 ToeJam & Earl (1991) – Original concept art Character Designs
 Zombies Ate My Neighbors (1993) – artwork
 ToeJam & Earl in Panic on Funkotron (1993) – Original concept art Character Designs
 Sam & Max Hit the Road (1993) – design, graphics and artwork
 The Horde (1994) – artwork
 Mortimer and the Riddles of the Medallion (1996) – artwork
 Herc's Adventures (1997) – artwork
 The Curse of Monkey Island (1997) – artwork
 Cars (2006) – writing and additional voices
 Cars: Radiator Springs Adventures (2006) – writing and additional voices
 Cars Mater-National Championship (2007) – writing and additional voices
 Sam & Max Save the World (2006–2007) – writing and design
 Sam & Max Beyond Time and Space (2007–2008) – writing and design
 Tales of Monkey Island (2009) – artwork
 Sam & Max: The Devil's Playhouse (2010) – artwork
 Sam & Max: This Time It's Virtual (2020) – writing and design and the voice of Duncan Dills

References

External links

1961 births
21st-century American screenwriters
American comics artists
American comics writers
American film directors
American male voice actors
American male screenwriters
American video game designers
American webcomic creators
Place of birth missing (living people)
Animators from California
California College of the Arts alumni
Living people
Lucasfilm people
Role-playing game artists
Pixar people
Screenwriters from California
21st-century American male writers